Ninetta is an Italian given name that is a diminutive form of Antonietta and Antonetta in use in Italy. Notable people with this name include the following:

Ninetta May Runnals (1885–1980), American academic
Nineta Barbulescu (born 1968), Romanian career diplomat
Ninetta Vad (born 1989), Hungarian canoer
Netta Eames, born Ninetta Wiley (1852–1944), American writer

See also

Nietta Zocchi
Nineta Barbulescu
Ninette (disambiguation)
Ninetto Davoli

Notes

Italian feminine given names